Asclerobia  is a species of snout moth in the genus Asclerobia. It was described by Émile Louis Ragonot in 1893, and is known from Australia.

References

Moths described in 1893
Phycitini
Moths of Australia